Neoclytus pubicollis is a species of beetle in the family Cerambycidae. It was described by Fisher in 1932.

References

Neoclytus
Beetles described in 1932